The men's team sabre was one of eight fencing events on the fencing at the 1984 Summer Olympics programme. It was the seventeenth appearance of the event. The competition was held from 8 to 9 August 1984. 40 fencers from 8 nations competed.

Rosters

Results

Round 1

Round 1 Pool A 

In the first set of matches, France defeated Canada 9–5 and West Germany beat the United States 9–4. The second set saw the winners both win again (securing advancement, with a head-to-head match determining the bye) and the loser both lose again (setting up a head-to-head match for the last advancement place), as France prevailed over the United States 9–4 and West Germany won against Canada 9–6. Finally, France took the top spot in the group and the bye by beating West Germany 9–2 while the United States secured the last advancement spot by beating Canada 9–1.

Round 1 Pool B 

In the first set of matches, Italy defeated China 9–4 and Romania beat Great Britain 9–4. The second set saw the winners both win again (securing advancement, with a head-to-head match determining the bye) and the loser both lose again (setting up a head-to-head match for the last advancement place), as Italy prevailed over Great Britain 9–0 and Romania won against China 9–4. Finally, Italy took the top spot in the group and the bye by beating West Germany 9–3 while China secured the last advancement spot by beating Great Britain 8–6.

Elimination rounds

References

Fencing at the 1984 Summer Olympics
Men's events at the 1984 Summer Olympics